"Naked / Fight Together / Tempest" is a triple A-side single by Japanese recording artist, Namie Amuro. It was released on July 24, 2011, through Avex Trax. The single peaked at number 2 on the Oricon charts.

Track listing

Charts

"Naked"

"Fight Together"

"Tempest"

References

2011 singles
Namie Amuro songs